Donald Robertson Gow (8 February 1868 – 1945) was a Scottish footballer who played for Rangers, Sunderland and the Scottish national football team as a full back.

Club career
Previously playing for Rangers where he claimed a Scottish Football League winner's medal from his first spell at Rangers in the competition's first edition of 1890–91, Gow made his debut for Sunderland against Bolton Wanderers on 19 September 1891 in a 4–3 defeat at Pike's Lane. He won the English Football League Championship in 1892 and 1895. He played for Sunderland on two separate occasions, between 1891 and 1892 then 1893 and 1897 with a year back at Rangers in the interim, in total making 98 league appearances scoring one goal at his time at the club.

International career
While a Rangers player, Gow made his debut and only appearance for Scotland against England on 17 March 1888 in a 5–0 defeat at Hampden Park. Gow captained the Scottish side in this game. It is likely he would have gained more caps while with Sunderland had the Scottish Football Association not operated a policy of selecting only home-based players until 1896 (a situation which also affected Sunderland teammate Ned Doig among many others). After this was relaxed, Gow played in the Home Scots v Anglo-Scots trial match of 1897 but unlike Doig, did not make the full Scotland team again.

Personal life
His brother John was also a Scottish international.

See also
List of Scotland national football team captains
List of Scottish football families

References
Donald Gow's careers stats at The Stat Cat

1868 births
1945 deaths
Scottish footballers
Footballers from Perth and Kinross
Scotland international footballers
Sunderland A.F.C. players
Rangers F.C. players
Scottish Football League players
English Football League players
Association football fullbacks
English Football League representative players
New Brighton Tower F.C. players
Millwall F.C. players
Southern Football League players